Carolyn Beatrice Parker (November 18, 1917 – March 17, 1966) was a physicist who worked from 1943 to 1947 on the Dayton Project, the polonium research and development arm of the Manhattan Project. She was one of a small number of African American scientists and technicians on the Manhattan Project. She then became an assistant professor in physics at Fisk University.

Parker earned two master's degrees, one in mathematics from the University of Michigan in 1941 and one in physics from MIT in 1951. According to family, her completion of a doctorate in physics at MIT was prevented by the leukemia that would kill her at age 48. Leukemia was an occupational risk for workers on the Dayton Project.

Parker is the first African-American woman known to have gained a postgraduate degree in physics.

Early life and education
Carolyn Beatrice Parker was born in Gainesville, Florida, on November 18, 1917. Her father, Julius A. Parker, was a successful physician and pharmacist who graduated from Meharry Medical College, the first medical school in the South for African-Americans. Her mother was Della Ella Murrell Parker. Carolyn Parker's maternal first cousin Joan Murrell Owens, was a marine biologist who was one of the first African-American women to receive a PhD in geology.

Parker was one of six children, all but one of whom received natural science or mathematics degrees. Mary Parker Miller had a Masters of Science in mathematics from New York University in 1975; Juanita Parker Wynter had a Bachelor of Science in mathematics and chemistry, and a Master of Science from New York University; Julie Leslie Parker had a Bachelor of Science in mathematics from Fisk University and a master's degree in medical technology from Meharry Medical College; and Julius Parker Jr had a master's degree in chemistry from the University of Michigan. The sixth sibling, Martha Parker, studied social sciences, gaining a master's degree from Temple University.

Parker graduated magna cum laude with an A.B. (Bachelor of Arts) degree from Fisk University in 1938, then an A.M. (Master of Arts) in mathematics from the University of Michigan in 1941.

She undertook further studies from 1946–1947 at Ohio State University, towards the end of time of her time on the Dayton Project. She earned a master's in physics from the Massachusetts Institute of Technology (MIT) in 1951. According to members of Parker's family, she had completed the course work for her PhD in physics at MIT around 1952 or 1953, but died of leukemia, apparently due to job-related exposure to radiation, before she was able to defend her dissertation. She is the first African-American woman known to have gained a postgraduate degree in physics.

Career
Parker taught in public schools in Rochelle, Florida, from 1938 to 1939, in Gainesville, Florida, from 1939 to 1940, and in Newport News, Virginia, from 1941 to 1942. She was an instructor in physics and mathematics at Bluefield State College from 1942 to 1943.

From 1943 to 1947, Parker was a research physicist on the Dayton Project, at the Wright-Patterson Air Force Base in Dayton, Ohio. The Dayton Project was part of the Manhattan Project to develop atomic weapons in World War II, and continuing into the Cold War. The Monsanto Chemical Company led top-secret research work on using polonium as the initiator for atomic explosions. Parker's sister, Juanita Parker Wynter, reported in an interview that her work there was "so secret she couldn't discuss it, even with us, her family".

In 1947, Parker became an assistant professor of physics at Fisk University in Tennessee.

Parker was a member of the Institute of Radio Engineers, the American Physical Society, Sigma Upsilon Pi, and Delta Sigma Theta.

Personal life
Parker's family report that she died of leukemia, which they believe was radiation-induced. Leukemia is regarded as a risk of occupational polonium exposure. Workers on the Dayton Project had weekly tests for polonium excretion. In 2000, the Energy Employees Occupational Illness Compensation Program included leukemia as a compensable illness for workers at the Dayton Project who were, or should have been, regularly monitored for polonium levels and were employed there over a certain time.

Parker died in Gainesville, Florida, on March 17, 1966, at the age of 48. She was Roman Catholic.

Legacy 
In 2020, during the international Black Lives Matter protests sparked by the murders of George Floyd and Ahmaud Arbery, and the shooting of Breonna Taylor, an elementary school and neighboring park in Gainesville that had been named after Confederate brigadier general Jesse Johnson Finley were renamed to Carolyn Beatrice Parker Elementary School and Park in her honor.

References

Further information
Carolyn Beatrice Parker is listed in: Gates LH Jr, Burkett NH, Burkett RK. Black biographical dictionaries, 1790–1950 [microform].
Google Scholar records an incomplete citation to this study: Parker, Carolyn Beatrice. Range Distribution of 122 Mev (pi) and (pi−) Mesons in Brass. 1953.

1917 births
1966 deaths
People from Gainesville, Florida
African-American women scientists
20th-century American physicists
Fisk University alumni
University of Michigan alumni
Academics from Florida
Manhattan Project people
MIT Department of Physics alumni
20th-century African-American women
20th-century African-American scientists
Women on the Manhattan Project
20th-century American women scientists